Toghrul Shahriyar oghlu Asgarov (born on September 17, 1992, Ganja, Azerbaijan)  is an Azerbaijani wrestler. He is an Olympic and European champion in freestyle wrestling.

In 2012 Summer Olympics Toghrul Asgarov won Olympic wrestling gold medal in men's 60-kilogram freestyle, beating Besik Kudukhov of Russia by a score of (1-0, 5-0).

In May 2017, he was disqualified for one year due to the doping rules violation (higenamine).

References

External links
 Bio on Fila-Wrestling.com
Video about career of Toghrul Asgarov

Living people
1992 births
Sportspeople from Ganja, Azerbaijan
Azerbaijani male sport wrestlers
Olympic gold medalists for Azerbaijan
Olympic silver medalists for Azerbaijan
Wrestlers at the 2012 Summer Olympics
Wrestlers at the 2016 Summer Olympics
Olympic wrestlers of Azerbaijan
Olympic medalists in wrestling
Medalists at the 2012 Summer Olympics
Wrestlers at the 2015 European Games
European Games medalists in wrestling
European Games gold medalists for Azerbaijan
World Wrestling Championships medalists
Doping cases in wrestling
Azerbaijani sportspeople in doping cases
European Wrestling Champions
21st-century Azerbaijani people